Dastgerd-e Mar (also Romanized as Dastgerd-e Mār; also known as Dastgerd and Dastjerdbār) is a village in Baraan-e Shomali Rural District, in the Central District of Isfahan County, Isfahan Province, Iran. At the 2006 census, its population was 653, in 153 families.

References 

Populated places in Isfahan County